Wayne Oren Nordhagen (born July 4, 1948) is an American former Major League Baseball outfielder and designated hitter. He played eight seasons in the majors for the Chicago White Sox (1976–81), Toronto Blue Jays (1982), Pittsburgh Pirates (1982) and Chicago Cubs (1983).

Career
Drafted by the New York Yankees in 1968, Nordhagen played in 502 games in eight major league seasons. In an oddity, Nordhagen was traded twice in ten days for the same player, outfielder Dick Davis. On June 15, 1982, Nordhagen was traded by the Blue Jays to the Philadelphia Phillies for Davis. Later that day, without having played for the Phillies, he was traded again, this time to the Pirates for outfielder Bill Robinson. On June 25, after playing in just one game for the Pirates (going 2-for-4 with 2 RBI), Nordhagen was traded back to the Blue Jays as the player to be named later in a trade that occurred on June 22, in which the Pirates had acquired the very same Dick Davis.

Personal life
Nordhagen is the uncle of former major league player Kevin Millar.

Nordhagen lives in Southern California with his wife of 71 years, Carrie. The couple have three daughters.

References

External links

1948 births
Living people
Águilas del Zulia players
American expatriate baseball players in Venezuela
American expatriate baseball players in Canada
American people of Norwegian descent
Baseball players from Minnesota
Bradenton Explorers players
Chicago Cubs players
Chicago White Sox players
Iowa Oaks players
Johnson City Yankees players
Kinston Eagles players
Major League Baseball designated hitters
Major League Baseball outfielders
Oklahoma City 89ers players
People from Thief River Falls, Minnesota
Pittsburgh Pirates players
Portland State Vikings baseball players
Richmond Braves players
Syracuse Chiefs players
Toronto Blue Jays players
Treasure Valley Chukars baseball players
Tulsa Oilers (baseball) players
Venados de Mazatlán players
American expatriate baseball players in Mexico
West Haven Yankees players